Jack of Shadows is a science fantasy novel by American author Roger Zelazny. According to him, the name of the book (but not the titular character) was an homage to Jack Vance. In his introduction to the novel he mentioned that he tried to capture some of the exotic landscapes that are frequent in Vance's work. Zelazny wrote it in first draft, with no rewrites. The novel was serialized in the  Magazine of Fantasy and Science Fiction in 1971 and published in book form that same year. It was nominated for a 1972 Hugo Award and finished #4 in the 1972 Locus Poll for Best Novel.

The text of the serialization and the published book are slightly different. A copy-editing error garbled a conversation between Jack and Morningstar in chapter 6; the correct version appeared in the original magazine appearance and has been reprinted on pages 511–512 of The Collected Stories of Roger Zelazny, Volume 3: This Mortal Mountain, NESFA Press, 2009.

Plot summary
The novel is set in a world that is tidally locked. Thus one side of the planet is always in light, and the other in darkness. Science rules on the dayside, while magic holds sway in the night.

Powerful magical entities live on the night side of the planet, and for the most part the entities' magical powers emanate from distinct loci.  Jack of Shadows (also known as Shadowjack), the main character, is unique among the magical beings in that he draws his power not from a physical location but from shadow itself. He is nearly incapacitated in complete light or complete darkness, but given access to even a small area of shadow, his potency is unmatched.

Jack's only friend, the creature Morningstar, is punished by being trapped in stone at the edge of the night, to be released when dawn comes.  His torso and head protrude from the rock, and he awaits the sun that will never rise.

Jack seeks "The Key That Was Lost", Kolwynia. The Key itself and the consequences of its use parallel Jack's progress in his own endeavors. Ultimately, the Key will be responsible for Jack's salvation and his doom.

Fleeing the dark side, Jack gets access to a computer and uses it to recover Kolwynia.  This makes him unbeatable, but not all-powerful.  Having made a mess of ruling with his new powers, he seeks the advice of Morningstar, who advises him to destroy The Machine at the Heart of the World, which maintains the world's stability, and set it rotating.

Reception
Lester del Rey received the novel unfavorably, noting that while the opening half was "minor Zelazny, quite enjoyable", the conclusion was "rather grim and ugly…[ultimately] dull". He concluded that, with the essentials of the hero's biography left unrevealed, "the whole thing seems rather pointless". However, reader response was largely favorable, as evidenced by the fact that the novel was nominated for two major speculative fiction awards (the Hugo Award and the Locus Award).

Additional stories of Jack of Shadows
Zelazny was pressured by fans to write a sequel but he declined, saying “I didn’t really intend to continue that one. I liked ending it with that sort of ambiguous ending.” Instead, he wrote several prequels.

The Illustrated Roger Zelazny includes a short story, "Shadowjack", that is a prequel to the events of the novel. It is in graphic novel format and was illustrated by Gray Morrow.

The Last Defender of Camelot (1981, Underwood-Miller) reprints the tale "Shadowjack" but without the illustrations. This was in the Underwood-Miller edition of the collection, but not the Pocket Books version. It also appears in Last Exit to Babylon: Volume 4: The Collected Stories of Roger Zelazny, NESFA Press, 2009.

Wizards, edited by Bill Fawcett in 1983, contains the character biography entitled "Shadowjack". This was written by Roger Zelazny and details aspects of the character's history that were not in the novel or in the short story of the same name. It has also been reprinted in Last Exit to Babylon.

"Shadowland" was another prequel, written by Zelazny as the outline for an unproduced animated movie. It takes place prior to events of the novel and the short story, and describes how the strange half magic/half science world of Jack of Shadows came into existence. It was later developed and in production as a graphic novel before Zelazny died but the project was abandoned. The story first appears in The Road to Amber: Volume 6: The Collected Stories of Roger Zelazny, NESFA Press, 2009.

Allusions and references in other works
A song, "Jack of Shadows", based on the novel and written by Dave Brock, Robert Calvert, Simon King and Simon House, appears on the 1979 Hawkwind album PXR5.

In Daniel Keys Moran’s novel The Long Run, the protagonist Trent Castanaveras is rescued from a low Lunar orbit by a stealth spacecraft from the Spacefarers Collective called the "Jack of Shadows".

Award nominations
Hugo Award nominee, 1972
Locus Award nominee, 1972

Notes

References

 Fredericks, S. C. (1979). Roger Zelazny and the Trickster Myth: An Analysis of Jack of Shadows; The Journal of American Culture 2 (2), 271–278.

External links
 
 A 2001 Usenet posting (following on an earlier discussion thread) discussing changes in the book version in the dialog between Jack and Morningstar in chapter 6, based on the original version of the passage that appeared in F&SF.

1971 American novels
1971 fantasy novels
Novels by Roger Zelazny
Novels first published in serial form
Science fantasy novels
Works originally published in The Magazine of Fantasy & Science Fiction